Union Pacific 4014, also known as the "Big Boy", is a steam locomotive owned and operated by the Union Pacific Railroad (UP) as part of their heritage fleet. It is a four-cylinder simple articulated 4-8-8-4 "Big Boy" type built in 1941 by the American Locomotive Company (ALCO) at its Schenectady Locomotive Works. It was assigned to haul heavy freight trains in the Wasatch mountain range. The locomotive was retired from revenue service in 1959 and was donated to the Railway and Locomotive Historical Society; thereafter, it was displayed in Fairplex at the RailGiants Train Museum in Pomona, California.

In 2013, UP re-acquired the locomotive and launched a restoration project at their Steam Shop in Cheyenne, Wyoming. In May 2019, No. 4014 moved under its own power for the first time after sitting dormant for almost six decades, becoming the world's largest operational steam locomotive and the only operating Big Boy locomotive of the eight that remain in existence. It now operates in excursion service for the UP steam program. No. 4014 became the first mainline steam locomotive to be equipped with the positive train control (PTC) system in 2021.

History

Design

The Big Boy class was developed by Union Pacific's (UP) chief mechanical officer Otto Jabelmann and built by the American Locomotive Company (ALCO) in the 1940s to handle the 1.14% eastbound ruling grade of the Wasatch Range.

The Big Boy was articulated like the Mallet locomotive design, although without compounding. It is longer than two city buses and weighs more than a Boeing 747.

Revenue service and retirement
ALCO built No. 4014 in November 1941 at a cost of $265,174 and delivered it the following month to Union Pacific, where it was placed in revenue service. No. 4014 was part of the first group of 20 Big Boys, classified as 4884–1.

No. 4014's last routine repairs took place in 1956. The locomotive completed its final revenue run on July 21, 1959, just hours before the last revenue run by any Big Boy. It had traveled  during its twenty years of revenue service. Union Pacific retired No. 4014 on December 7, 1961. All of the remaining Big Boys were retired by 1962, when their duties were taken over by diesel locomotives and gas turbine-electric locomotives (GTELs). That same year, Union Pacific donated No. 4014 to the Southern California chapter of the Railway and Locomotive Historical Society in Pomona, California, where it became one of the eight Big Boys preserved around the United States.

Ownership transfer and restoration

In late 2012, Union Pacific officials announced that they would obtain a Big Boy locomotive, and they would restore it to operational condition for excursion service.

On July 23, 2013, the Southern California chapter of the Railway and Locomotive Historical Society agreed to transfer ownership of No. 4014 back to Union Pacific.

On November 14, 2013, No. 4014 began its journey to the UP Steam Shop in Cheyenne. It was pulled from its display site at the museum, on temporary track, to the adjacent parking lot. On January 26, 2014, No. 4014 was pulled from the Los Angeles County Fairplex to the Covina station on Metrolink trackage by No. 1996, an SD70ACe diesel locomotive painted in Southern Pacific colors. It presently arrived at UP's West Colton Yard in Bloomington, California, where it sat on display until April 28, when it began its journey to Cheyenne. After arriving at the Steam Shop's roundhouse on May 8, No. 4014 sat largely idle for two years while the UP steam crew worked to overhaul No. 844. The Steam Shop also used the time to expand and upgrade its facilities to accommodate a Big Boy.

In August 2016, a month after No. 844's repairs and inspection were complete, UP officials announced that the restoration work of No. 4014 had begun under Heritage Fleet Operations director Ed Dickens. By early 2017, the locomotive had been completely disassembled. Some new parts were fabricated, including the rod brasses, top boiler check valve and lubricator check valves. The driving wheels were sent to be repaired by the Strasburg Rail Road in Strasburg, Pennsylvania, for crankpin and axle work as well as installing new tires.

The work included one major alteration: converting the coal-burning locomotive to run on No. 5 fuel oil. This was done by replacing the firebox grates with a fire pan and an oil burner. This made No. 4014 the first Big Boy to undergo a coal-to-oil conversion since No. 4005, which ran on oil from 1946 until it was converted back to coal in 1948 due to uneven heating in its large, single-burner firebox. No. 4014's old firebox grates were salvaged and used on the Milwaukee Road 261 steam locomotive.

In March 2018, it was reported that the process of putting the locomotive back together had begun; ten months later, the locomotive's restoration was nearly finished. In December 2018, Union Pacific asked the Federal Railroad Administration (FRA) to exempt UP Nos. 4014 and 844 from federal Positive Train Control (PTC) requirements; in February 2019, the FRA officials responded that such waivers were not needed. On February 6, 2019, No. 4014's boiler passed a hydrostatic test and the locomotive was successfully test-fired on April 9. Around 9 p.m. on May 1, 2019, No. 4014 moved under its own power for the first time in almost 60 years. The following evening, the locomotive made its first test run, from Cheyenne to Nunn, Colorado.

Excursion service
Upon the completion of the restoration, No. 4014 joined the railroad's never-retired No. 844 steam locomotive in excursion service. No. 4014 also became the world's largest operational steam locomotive, displacing (and later replacing) No. 3985, which was in poor mechanical condition at the time No. 4014 was restored to operation.

In May 2019, No. 4014 made its first excursion run amid the celebrations marking 150 years since the completion of the First transcontinental railroad. Following its May 4 christening at the Cheyenne Depot Museum, No. 4014 — doubleheaded with No. 844 — traveled to Ogden, Utah. No. 4014 subsequently made two tours on its own. From July 8 to August 8, it visited the Midwestern United States, including brief stops at Saint Paul Union Depot and the Lake Superior Railroad Museum; it then toured the Southwestern United States from September 27 to November 26.

Due to the COVID-19 pandemic, UP announced in March 2020 that it would cancel that year's steam operations with Nos. 4014 and 844. Excursion operations resumed in August and September 2021 with No. 4014 doing tour stops in Fort Worth and Houston, Texas; New Orleans, Louisiana; North Little Rock, Arkansas; St. Louis, Missouri; and Denver, Colorado. Also in 2021, No. 4014 became the first mainline steam locomotive to be equipped with new PTC equipment.

On April 11, 2022, UP originally announced that No. 4014 would tour the Northwestern United States, starting on June 26 in commemoration of UP's 160th anniversary, but the tour was canceled on April 22 so UP could reduce supply chain congestion. In late July 2022, No. 4014 pulled the Museum Special excursion between Cheyenne and the Denver Union Station to benefit the Union Pacific Railroad Museum.

Gallery

See also
Chesapeake and Ohio class H-8
Norfolk and Western 1218
Union Pacific 4012
Union Pacific 4023
Union Pacific 5511
Western Maryland Scenic Railroad 1309

Notes

References

External links

 Big Boy No. 4014 - Union Pacific

4-8-8-4 locomotives
4014
ALCO locomotives
Simple articulated locomotives
Railway locomotives introduced in 1941
Individual locomotives of the United States
Standard gauge locomotives of the United States
Preserved steam locomotives of Wyoming